Khamica Bingham (born June 15, 1994) is a Canadian track and field athlete who specialises in the 100 metres. She has represented Canada at the Pan American Games, Commonwealth Games and the World Championships in Athletics.

Bingham was born on June 15, 1994 in North York, Ontario. As a high schooler, she attended Heart Lake Secondary School. Originally a national-level gymnast, she switched to track due to the financial burden to her family of staying in her first sport.

In July 2012 she competed in the 100m at 14th IAAF World Junior Championships, placing 4th. She became part of the national record women's  relay team along with Kimberly Hyacinthe, Crystal Emmanuel and Shai-Anne Davis.

In July 2016 she was officially named to Canada's Olympic team.

She competed at the 2020 Summer Olympics.

References

External links
 
 
 Khamica Bingham Profile at All-Athletics.com

1994 births
Living people
Sportspeople from North York
Athletes from Toronto
Black Canadian female track and field athletes
Canadian female sprinters
Commonwealth Games competitors for Canada
Athletes (track and field) at the 2014 Commonwealth Games
Pan American Games silver medalists for Canada
Pan American Games bronze medalists for Canada
Pan American Games medalists in athletics (track and field)
Athletes (track and field) at the 2015 Pan American Games
Athletes (track and field) at the 2019 Pan American Games
Pan American Games track and field athletes for Canada
World Athletics Championships athletes for Canada
York University alumni
Athletes (track and field) at the 2016 Summer Olympics
Olympic track and field athletes of Canada
Medalists at the 2015 Pan American Games
Medalists at the 2019 Pan American Games
Athletes (track and field) at the 2020 Summer Olympics
Olympic female sprinters